The Simpsons is an American animated sitcom created by Matt Groening for the Fox Broadcasting Company. It is a satirical depiction of a dysfunctional middle-class American lifestyle starring the eponymous family: Homer, Marge, Bart, Lisa, and Maggie. Set in the town of Springfield, the show lampoons both American culture and the human condition. The family was conceived by Groening shortly before a pitch for a series of animated shorts with producer James L. Brooks. Groening named each character (other than Bart an anagram for brat) after members of his own family. The shorts became part of the Fox series The Tracey Ullman Show on April 19, 1987. After a three-season run, the sketch was developed into a half-hour prime-time hit show.

Since its debut on December 17, 1989, The Simpsons has broadcast 745 episodes, as of March 19, 2023. The show holds several American television longevity records. It is the longest-running prime-time animated series and longest-running sitcom in the United States. With its twenty-first season (2009–10), the series surpassed Gunsmoke in seasons to claim the spot as the longest-running American prime-time scripted television series, and later also surpassed Gunsmoke in episode count with the twenty-ninth season episode "Forgive and Regret" on April 29, 2018.

Episodes of The Simpsons have won dozens of awards, including 31 Emmys (ten for Outstanding Animated Program), 30 Annies, and a Peabody. The Simpsons Movie, a feature-length film, was released in theaters worldwide on July 26 and 27, 2007 and grossed US$526.2 million worldwide. The first twenty seasons are available on DVD in regions 1, 2, and 4, with the twentieth season released on both DVD and Blu-ray in 2010 to celebrate the 20th anniversary of the series. On April 8, 2015, showrunner Al Jean announced that there would be no more DVD or Blu-ray releases, shifting focus to digital distribution, although this was later reversed on July 22, 2017. Almost two years later, on July 20, 2019, it was announced that Season 19 would be released on December 3, 2019, on DVD.

On January 26, 2023, The Simpsons was renewed for seasons 35 and 36. On February 19, 2012, The Simpsons reached its 500th episode in the twenty-third season. It reached its 600th episode on October 16, 2016, in its twenty-eighth season. On March 21, 2021, The Simpsons reached its 700th episode in its thirty-second season.

Season 34 debuted on Fox on September 25, 2022.

Series overview

Episodes

Season 21 (2009–10)

Season 22 (2010–11)

Season 23 (2011–12)

Season 24 (2012–13)

Season 25 (2013–14)

Family Guy Crossover (2014)

Season 26 (2014–15)

Season 27 (2015–16)

Season 28 (2016–17)

Season 29 (2017–18)

Season 30 (2018–19)

Season 31 (2019–20)

Season 32 (2020–21)

Season 33 (2021–22)

Season 34 (2022–23)

Upcoming episodes without a scheduled air date

See also

The Simpsons shorts
"The Simpsons Guy" – a crossover episode of Family Guy
The Simpsons home media

Notes

References

Bibliography

External links

Lists of American adult animated television series episodes
Lists of American sitcom episodes

Episodes from seasons 21-present